One Kennedy Square is a 10-story building located at 777 Woodward Avenue in Downtown Detroit, Michigan, near Campus Martius Park. The building is bordered by Griswold Street, Michigan Avenue and Woodward Avenue, and stands on the site of the old Detroit City Hall. It is occupied by the Ernst & Young accounting firm.

Description

One Kennedy Square sits atop the 460-spot, municipally-owned Kennedy Square Underground Parking Garage, which was renovated by L.S. Brinker Company. The parking garage was a part of the old Kennedy Square.

Construction on the mid-rise started in 2005 and was completed in 2006. The building has 13 total floors, with 10 above-ground floors, and 3 basement floors.

One Kennedy Square was designed in the Modern architectural style, constructed with a translucent emerald green tinted glass exhibiting the role of color in architecture amidst Campus Martius Park's other modern foray, the golden topaz Compuware World Headquarters and the charcoal gray granite/glass 1001 Woodward Avenue Building. One Kennedy Square provides a unique backdrop, enlightening a new dimension for the Michigan Soldiers' and Sailors' Monument.

The architect is S. Kenneth Neumann of Neumann/Smith & Associates, the developer is REDICO and the construction manager is Spencer Dailey, Inc.

Nearby buildings include The Qube, the First National Building, 1001 Woodward, Chrysler House, the Penobscot Building, and the Cadillac Tower.

Facts
 This translucent, emerald green glass building is capped by a prominent spire which is lit at night.
 The building is 184'-6" to the top of the prominent glass screen that rises above the front façade of the building along Campus Martius Park.

References

Further reading

External links
Downtown Detroit photo gallery
Google Maps future location of One Kennedy Center

Skyscraper office buildings in Detroit
Ernst & Young